The 1912–13 Scottish Cup was the 40th staging of Scotland's most prestigious football knockout competition. The cup was won by Falkirk who defeated Raith Rovers in the final.

Calendar

First round

Replays

Second round

Replays

Second replays
Played at Shawfield and Celtic Park respectively.

Third round

Replay

Quarter-finals

Replay

Second replay
Played at Hampden Park.

Semi-finals

Replay

Final

See also
1912–13 in Scottish football

1912-13
Cup
1912–13 domestic association football cups